The 1874 City of Dunedin by-election was a by-election held  on 23 April 1874 in the  electorate in Dunedin during the 5th New Zealand Parliament.

The by-election was caused by the resignation of the incumbent, John Bathgate to when he resigned to take up the appointments of Dunedin resident magistrate and Otago district judge.

The winner of the by-election was Nathaniel Wales.

Wales was opposed by George Elliott Barton and James Gordon Stuart Grant.

Grant was a local eccentric and frequent candidate.

Results

References 

 

Dunedin 1874
1874 elections in New Zealand
April 1874 events
Politics of Dunedin
1870s in Dunedin